Colorado Springs shooting may refer to:

 2007 Colorado YWAM and New Life shootings, a pair of related shootings in December 2007, one of which occurred in Colorado Springs
 October 2015 Colorado Springs shooting, one of two shootings to occur in 2015
 Colorado Springs Planned Parenthood shooting, the second of two shootings to occur in 2015, during November
 2021 Colorado Springs shooting, a shooting in May 2021
 Colorado Springs nightclub shooting, a shooting in November 2022